Zoya Anatolyevna Kosmodemyanskaya (September 13, 1923 – November 29, 1941) was a Soviet partisan. She was executed after acts of sabotage against the invading armies of Nazi Germany; after stories emerged of her defiance towards her captors, she was posthumously declared a Hero of the Soviet Union. She became one of the most revered heroines of the Soviet Union.

Family
From the 17th century, the Kosmodemyansky were priests in the Russian Orthodox Church. Zoya's grandfather Pyotr Kosmodemyansky was murdered in 1918 by militant atheists for his opposition to blasphemy.

Zoya (her name is a Russian form of the Greek name Zoe, which means "life") was born in 1923 in the village of Osino-Gay (meaning Aspen Woods), near the city of Tambov. Her father, Anatoly Kosmodemyansky, studied in a theological seminary, but did not graduate. He later worked as a librarian. Her mother, Lyubov Kosmodemyanskaya (née Churikova), was a school teacher. In 1925, Zoya's brother, Aleksandr Kosmodemyansky, was born. Like his sister, he was awarded the Hero of the Soviet Union, and, like Zoya, posthumously.

In 1929, the family moved to Siberia for fear of persecution. In 1930, they moved to Moscow.

Life and death
Kosmodemyanskaya joined the Komsomol in 1938. In October 1941, still a high school student in Moscow, she volunteered for a partisan unit. During the course of her army service, she idealized Tatiana Solomakha, a Red Army  soldier who was tortured and killed during the course of the Russian Civil War. She was assigned to the partisan unit 9903 (Staff of the Western Front). At the village of Obukhovo near Naro-Fominsk, Kosmodemyanskaya and other partisans crossed the front line and entered territory occupied by the Germans. They mined roads and cut communication lines.

On November 27, 1941, Kosmodemyanskaya received an assignment to burn the village of Petrishchevo, where a German cavalry regiment was stationed. Together with fellow partisans Boris Krainov and Vasily Klubkov, she set fire to three houses in the village. The partisans believed that one of the houses was being used as a German communications center and that occupying forces were using others for accommodation. The writer A. Zhovtis has disputed these claims, arguing that officially Petrishchevo was not a point of permanent deployment of German troops. However, the villagers said that virtually all the houses of the village were used for accommodation by the German troops transported along the main roads near the village.

After the first attempt at arson, Krainov did not wait for Kosmodemyanskaya and Klubkov at the agreed meeting place and left, returning to his own. Later, Klubkov was also captured by the Germans. Kosmodemyanskaya, having missed her comrades and left alone, decided to return to Petrishchevo and continue the arson campaign. However, the German military authorities in the village had by then organized a gathering of local residents, forming a militia in order to avoid further arson. After being arrested, Kosmodemyanskaya was stripped, beaten, interrogated and tortured with 200 lashes and her body burnt, but refused to give any information. The following morning she was marched to the center of the village with a board around her neck bearing the inscription 'Houseburner' and hanged.

Her final words were:

and to the Germans:

Before the moment of hanging, with the rope on her neck, she said:

The Germans left her body hanging on the gallows for several weeks. One of her breasts was cut off by a drunk German near Christmas Eve, and her body desecrated by Germans or collaborators. Eventually she was hastily buried by the Germans to cover up their crimes just before the Soviets regained the territory in January 1942.

Fame
The story of Kosmodemyanskaya's death became popular after Pravda published an article written by Pyotr Lidov on January 27, 1942. The journalist had heard about her execution from an elderly peasant, and was impressed by her courage. The witness recounted: "They were hanging her and she was giving a speech. They were hanging her and she was threatening them." Lidov travelled to Petrishchevo, collected details from local residents and published an article about the then-unknown partisan girl. Soon after, Joseph Stalin noticed the article. He proclaimed: "Here is the people's heroine", which started a propaganda campaign honouring Kosmodemyanskaya. Stalin ordered that the soldiers and officers of the 197th Infantry Division (Wehrmacht), which participated in the execution, should not be taken prisoner. In February, she was identified and was awarded the order of Hero of the Soviet Union.

Kosmodemyanskaya's account was repeatedly published in Pravda. Numerous Soviet writers, artists, sculptors and poets dedicated their works to her. In 1944, the film Zoya was made about her. She was also referred to in the film Girl No. 217, which depicted atrocities committed against Soviet prisoners of war by the Nazis. Her image was also used frequently in anti-German propaganda which encouraged violence against the German occupying forces.

Many streets, kolkhozes and Pioneer organizations in the Soviet Union were named after Kosmodemyanskaya. Her portrait became a part of ceremonial procedures of commemoration performed by pioneers, and was used as a symbol of the highest distinction awarded to the best class in school. The Soviets erected a monument in her honour not far from the village of Petrishchevo. Another statue is located at the Partizanskaya Moscow Metro station. A 4108-meter (13,478 feet) mountain peak in Trans-Ili Alatau is named after her. A minor planet 1793 Zoya, discovered in 1968 by Soviet astronomer Tamara Mikhailovna Smirnova, is named after her. Kosmodemyanskaya is buried at Novodevichy Cemetery in Moscow.

In the Ukrainian city of Chernihiv, a Kosmodemyanskaya monument was destroyed on 21 April 2022 amidst a derussification campaign. In December 2022 the Zoya Kosmodemyanskaya street in Ukraine's capital Kyiv was renamed to (World War I Ukrainian Sich Riflemen member)  street.

Zoya Phan, an outspoken political activist for the Karen people and member of the Burma Campaign UK, was named after Zoya Kosmodemyanskaya by her father, Padoh Mahn Sha Lah Phan. He chose the name because he had read about Kosmodemyanskaya while studying at Yangon University and saw several parallels between the Karen resistance against the Burmese government and the Soviet resistance against the Nazis in Europe.

Post-Soviet research and controversy

1990s media controversy
Kosmodemyanskaya's life became a subject of media controversy during the 1990s. In September 1991, an article by Aleksandr Zhovtis was published in the weekly Russian magazine Argumenty i Fakty. The article alleged that there were no German troops in the village of Petrishchevo, in spite of several photos of her being hanged by German soldiers. Zhovtis blamed Stalin's scorched earth policy for the "unnecessary" death of the young woman. The newspaper subsequently published letters from readers, many of which included stories contradicting the mainstream version. One researcher claimed that the person executed in Petrishchevo was not Zoya Kosmodemyanskaya but a "missing in action" partisan, although later official conclusion from the Institute for Criminal Expertise and the Department of Justice of the Russian Federation stated otherwise. The Argumenty i Fakty articles prompted a response from Pravda observer Viktor Kozhemyaka in the form of an article titled "Fifty years after her death Zoya is tortured and executed again". Ten years later, Kozhemyaka wrote another article "Zoya is executed yet again", in which he lamented some "absurd material" on Internet discussion forums, which alleged that Zoya had hurt Russian peasants rather than German troops, that she suffered from schizophrenia, and that she was a fanatical Stalinist.

In 1997, the newspaper Glasnost published the previously unknown protocols of the official commission of residents of Petrishchevo village and Gribtsovsky selsoviet from January 25, 1942 (two months after Zoya's execution). The protocols stated that Kosmodemyanskaya was caught while trying to destroy a stable containing more than 300 German horses. They also described her torture and execution.

A slightly different story was recorded in the notes of researcher Pyotr Lidov, published in Parlamentskaya Gazeta in 1999. According to these, Kosmodemyanskaya and Vasily Klubkov were caught while asleep on the outskirts of Petrishchevo. The Germans were called by Petrishchevo resident Semyon Sviridov. Lidov's notes also included an interview with a German noncommissioned officer taken prisoner by the Red Army. The interview described the negative effect on the morale of the German soldiers who witnessed the burning of the houses.

Klubkov's betrayal version
Some details of Kosmodemyanskaya's assignment and arrest were classified for about sixty years because treachery might have been involved. The case was declassified in 2002, and then reviewed by Russia's Chief Military Prosecutor Office, and it was decided that Vasily Klubkov, who betrayed Zoya Kosmodemyanskaya, was not eligible for rehabilitation. According to the case, three Soviet combatants, Zoya Kosmodemyanskaya, Vasily Klubkov, and their commander Boris Krainov, had to perform acts of sabotage in Reichskommissariat Ostland. They had been given the task of setting fire to houses in the village of Petrishchevo, where German troops were quartered. Krainov was to operate in the central part of the village, Kosmodemyanskaya in the southern and Klubkov in the northern parts. Krainov was the first to carry out his task and returned to the base. Kosmodemyanskaya performed her task too, and three columns of flame in the southern part of Petrishchevo were seen from the base. Only the northern part was not set on fire. According to Klubkov, he was captured by two German soldiers and taken to their headquarters. A German officer threatened to kill him, and Klubkov gave him the names of Kosmodemyanskaya and Krainov. After this, Kosmodemyanskaya was captured by the Germans.

See also
 List of female Heroes of the Soviet Union

References

 Lyubov Kosmodemyanskaya, Story of Zoya and Shura, Foreign Languages Publishing House: Moscow, 1953 ("Shura" is a nickname for "Alexander", the author is Zoya's mother).

External links

 Martyrdom of village priest Pyotr Kosmodemyansky (in Russian)
 Zoya's Story, a short biography, some tributes and excerpts from the book "Story of Zoya and Shura"
 Photo of dead Zoya 
 Biography (in Russian), on the website dedicated to the Heroes of the Soviet Union/Russia
 Short Biographical Article (in English), from Northstar Compass
 Zoya Kosmodemyanskaya From The Voice of Russia

1923 births
1941 deaths
People from Tambov Oblast
People from Kirsanovsky Uyezd
Women in the Russian and Soviet military
Female resistance members of World War II
Soviet partisans
Russian people of World War II
Heroes of the Soviet Union
Recipients of the Order of Lenin
Soviet prisoners of war
Resistance members killed by Nazi Germany
Executed Russian women
Executed Russian people
Soviet civilians killed in World War II
People executed by Nazi Germany by hanging
Russian people executed by Nazi Germany
Executed Soviet people from Russia
Burials at Novodevichy Cemetery

Russian women in World War II